Rick Jones is the name of:

 Rick Jones (baseball coach), American former head coach of the Tulane Green Wave baseball team
 Rick Jones (character), fictional character from the Marvel Universe
 Rick Jones (pitcher) (born 1955), Major League Baseball pitcher
 Rick Jones (politician) (born 1952), Republican politician from Michigan
 Rick Jones (television presenter) (1937–2021), BBC children's programme presenter (1960s–1970s)
 Rick Jones (voice actor) (born 1957), animation writer, director and voice actor

See also
 Rich Jones (disambiguation)
 Ricky Jones (disambiguation)
 Richard Jones (disambiguation)